Zanzi is an Italian surname. Notable people with the surname include:

Ernesto Zanzi (1904–?), Italian cyclist
Italo Zanzi (born 1974), American sports business executive and attorney
Vincenzo Zanzi (born 1978), Italian footballer

Italian-language surnames